Orthostatic proteinuria (synonyms: orthostatic albuminuria, postural proteinuria)  is a benign condition. A change in renal hemodynamics, which in some otherwise normal individuals, causes protein (mostly albumin) to appear in urine when they are in the standing position. Urine formed when these individuals are lying down is protein-free.

There is normal urinary protein excretion during the night but increased excretion during the day, associated with activity and upright posture. Total urinary protein excretion may be increased but levels above 1 g per 24 hours are more likely to be associated with underlying renal disease. The exact cause for orthostatic proteinuria is not known.

References

Nephrology